Queen Margaret of Denmark may refer to:

 Margaret Fredkulla (1080s–1130), wife of king Niels of Denmark
 Margarethe of Bohemia (1186–1212), aka Queen Dagmar, first wife of Valdemar II of Denmark
 Margaret Sambiria (1230–1282) of Pomerelia, wife of king Christopher I of Denmark
 Margaret I of Denmark (1353–1412), wife of Haakon VI of Norway, daughter of Valdemar IV of Denmark, mother of Olaf II of Denmark, also ruled Scandinavia as de facto queen regnant
 Margrethe II of Denmark (b. 1940), the present head of state of Denmark